Pseudomelpia is a genus of flies in the family Tabanidae.

Species
Pseudomelpia horrens Enderlein, 1925

References

Tabanidae
Brachycera genera
Diptera of South America
Taxa named by Günther Enderlein